The discography of Jane's Addiction, an American alternative rock band, consists of four studio albums, two live albums, four compilation albums, seventeen singles and ten music videos. Jane's Addiction was formed in Los Angeles, California in 1985. The band is composed of Perry Farrell (vocals), Dave Navarro (guitar), Eric Avery (bass) and Stephen Perkins (drums). After breaking up in 1991, Jane's Addiction briefly toured in 1997, reunited in 2001 and then parted ways in 2004. Jane's Addiction reunited again in 2008, with founding member Eric Avery returning on bass. In 2010, Avery Left once again, only to return once more in 2022. The band's varied musical style has influences rooted in punk rock and heavy metal.

Jane's Addiction was one of the first bands to emerge from the early 1990s alternative rock movement to gain mainstream media attention and commercial success in the United States. Their initial farewell tour launched the first Lollapalooza festival, an annual touring alternative rock showcase. As a result, Jane's Addiction became icons of what Farrell dubbed the "Alternative Nation".

Their debut album, Nothing's Shocking, was released in 1988 on Warner Bros. Records. The album was considered a failure on the music charts only reaching #103 on the Billboard 200, however, the album has since been certified 2× Multi-Platinum by the Recording Industry Association of America. Three singles, "Jane Says", "Mountain Song" and "Ocean Size", were released from the album in 1988 and 1989 respectively. Their debut single "Jane Says", became their first chart entry on the Alternative Songs chart, peaking at #6. The song was one of two songs from Nothing's Shocking to enter any Billboard chart ( "Ocean Size " #36 US Alternative ) .

In 1990, the group released their second studio album, Ritual de lo Habitual. The album reached the top 20 of the Billboard 200 and was also their highest-selling album to date, going 2× Platinum in the US. The album featured four singles including the number-one singles "Stop!" and "Been Caught Stealing". After this album, they took a 13-year hiatus away from new music, however, they did release six compilation and live albums between 1987 and 2009.

Strays was their first full-length studio album in 13 years. It was released on Capitol Records on July 22, 2003. It peaked at number 4 in the United States, along with many other international charts. The album's lead single, "Just Because", became their first appearance on the Billboard Hot 100. The song also became their first Top 5 on the Hot Mainstream Rock Tracks chart, as well as their third number one on the Alternative Songs chart. The second single, however, only made it into the Top 40 of the rock charts. Nevertheless, the album was certified gold.

After a four-year hiatus, Jane's Addiction reunited in 2008. After touring and recording, the band released its fourth studio album, The Great Escape Artist on October 18, 2011. In the summer of 2013, Jane's Addiction released a single, "Another Soulmate".

Albums

Studio albums

Live albums

Compilation albums

Singles

Music videos
"Trip Away"
"Mountain Song" (three versions)
"Ocean Size"
"Stop!"
"Been Caught Stealing"
"Ain't No Right" (live)
"Classic Girl"
"Jane Says" (live)
"Just Because"
"True Nature"
"End to the Lies"
"Irresistible Force"
"Underground"

Other appearances

References

Jane's Addiction
 
 
Discographies of American artists
Rock music group discographies